The Bingling Temple is a series of grottoes filled with Buddhist sculpture carved into natural caves and caverns in a canyon along the Yellow River. It lies just north of where the Yellow River empties into the Liujiaxia Reservoir. This temple, along with other sites along the Silk Road, was inscribed in 2014 on the UNESCO World Heritage List as the Silk Roads: the Routes Network of Chang'an-Tianshan Corridor World Heritage Site.

The caves were a work in progress for more than a millennium. The first grotto was begun around 420 CE at the end of the Western Qin kingdom. Work continued and more grottoes were added during the Wei, Sui, Tang, Song, Yuan, Ming, and Qing dynasties. The style of each grotto can easily be connected to the typical artwork from its corresponding dynasty. The Bingling Temple is both stylistically and geographically a midpoint between the monumental Buddhas of Bamiyan in Afghanistan and the Buddhist Grottoes of central China, Yungang Grottoes near Datong and Longmen Grottoes near Luoyang.

Over the centuries, earthquakes, erosion, and looters have damaged or destroyed many of the caves and the artistic treasures within. Altogether there are 183 caves, 694 stone statues, and 82 clay sculptures that remain. The relief sculpture and caves filled with buddhas and frescoes line the northern side of the canyon for about 200 meters. Each cave is like a miniature temple filled with Buddhist imagery. These caves culminate at a large natural cavern where wooden walkways precariously wind up the rock face to hidden cliff-side caves and the giant Maitreya Buddha that stands more than 27 meters, or almost 100 feet, tall.

Tourism
The sculptures, carvings, and frescoes that remain are outstanding examples of Buddhist artwork and draw visitors from around the world. The site is extremely remote and can only be reached during summer and fall by boat via the Liujiaxia Reservoir. Boats leave from near the Liujiaxia Dam in Liujiaxia City (Yongjing County's county seat), and sometimes also from other docks on the reservoir.  The rest of the year, the site is inaccessible, as there are no roads in the area.

See also 
 Buddhist art
 History of Buddhism
 List of colossal sculpture in situ

References

External link 

Buddhist grottoes in Gansu
Linxia Hui Autonomous Prefecture
Western Qin
Major National Historical and Cultural Sites in Gansu
World Heritage Sites in China